Dr. Periyar Dasan or Dr. Abdullah (born Seshachalam; 21 August 1949 – 19 August 2013) was an Indian scholar, professor, eminent speaker, and activist from Tamil Nadu. He propagated atheism and rationalist ideologies for most part of his life and later converted to Islam. He has also appeared in around 15 Tamil-language films.

Early life and background
Seshachalam was born in a Shaivite family on 21 August 1949 at Agaram in Perambur. He was attracted towards the rationalist ideals of Periyar E. V. Ramasamy, the founder of the Dravidian movement. During his days in Pachaiyappa’s College, he changed his original name to Periyar Dasan (ardent follower of Periyar).  He was well-versed in Tamil literature, various religious studies, and English. He has authored around 120 books. He served as a professor in his alma mater, Pachaiyappa’s College, for 34 years and as a corporate trainer, psychologist, psychotherapist, and students counsellor for many years.

In 1991, Dasan embraced Buddhism and added Siddhartha as a prefix to his name. He translated the Dhammapada, a compilation of Buddhist virtues, authored by B. R. Ambedkar, into Tamil. This took him to learn Pali and Sanskrit.

Taking everyone by surprise, he embraced Islam as his way of life on 11 March 2010 during a visit to Mecca and rechristened his name as Abdullah, and his wife Vasantha was given the name Fathima. Thereafter, he started giving a series of lectures on Islam.  Before embracing Islam, he spent 10 years knowing the key aspects of that religion and learning the Quran and the Arabic language.

Publications

Tamil 

 Translator: Dr. Ambedkar's புத்தரும் அவரது தம்மமும் - Buddharum avarathu dhammamum - Buddha and his Dhamma.
 Author: இந்திய மரபும் பார்ப்பன திரிபும் - Indhiya marabum paarpana thiriyum - Indian practice and Brahminical fudging.
 Author: கல்வி கற்கும் பிள்ளையே கேளாய்... - Kalvi karkum pillaye kelaai... - Oh child being educated, listen...

Filmography

Death
Dasan died on 19 August 2013 at the age of 63, after fighting liver cancer. He is survived by wife Vasantha and two sons Valavan and Suratha. As per his last wish, his body was given to the Madras Medical College for Research on August 20. Immediately after death, his eyes were donated to Sankara Nethralaya.

References

External links 

 Blog on Blogger.

Male actors in Tamil cinema
Indian male film actors
1949 births
2013 deaths
Converts to Islam from atheism or agnosticism
Islam in Tamil Nadu